The Samara Regional Duma is the regional parliament of Samara Oblast, a federal subject of Russia. A total of 50 deputies are elected for five-year terms.

Elections

2007

2011

2016

2021

References

Samara Oblast
Politics of Samara Oblast